Lady Eleanor Beauchamp, Baroness de Ros and Duchess of Somerset (September 1408 – 6 March 1467) was the second daughter of Richard de Beauchamp, 13th Earl of Warwick and Elizabeth de Berkeley, daughter of Thomas de Berkeley, 5th Baron Berkeley.

First marriage
On 17 December 1423, Lady Eleanor was married to Thomas de Ros, 8th Baron de Ros. They were parents of the following surviving issue:

Margaret de Ros (b. 1425 – d. 10 December 1488), married firstly (as his second wife) William de Botreaux, 3rd Baron Botreaux (d. 1462), secondly Thomas Burgh, 1st Baron Burgh of Gainsborough.
Thomas de Ros, 9th Baron de Ros (b. 9 September 1427 – d. 17 May 1464)
Richard Ros (b. 8 March 1429 – after 1492)

Second marriage
Eleanor married Edmund Beaufort, 2nd Duke of Somerset sometime between 1431 and 1433 in an unlicensed marriage, although this was pardoned on 7 March 1438. He was the son of John Beaufort, 1st Earl of Somerset and Lady Margaret Holland. They had the following surviving issue:

 Eleanor Beaufort, Countess of Ormonde (b. between 1431 and 1433 - d. August 16, 1501), married firstly James Butler, 5th Earl of Ormonde and secondly Sir Robert Spencer.
 Joan Beaufort (b. 1433 – d. 11 August 1518), married firstly Robert St Lawrence, 3rd Baron Howth  and secondly Sir Richard Fry.
 Anne Beaufort (b. 1435 – d. 17 September 1496), who married, Sir William Paston (b. 1436 – died before 7 September 1496), a younger son of William Paston (1378–1444), Justice of the Common Pleas.
 Henry Beaufort, 3rd Duke of Somerset (b. 26 January 1436 – d. 15 May 1464)
 Margaret Beaufort, Countess of Stafford (b. 1437 – d. 1474), married firstly Humphrey, Earl of Stafford and secondly Sir Richard Darell.
 Edmund Beaufort, 4th Duke of Somerset (b. 1439 – d. 4 May 1471)
 John Beaufort, Earl of Dorset (b. 1441 – 4 May 1471)
 Thomas Beaufort (b. 1442 – d. 1517)
 Elizabeth Beaufort (b. 1443 - died before 1475), married Sir Henry FitzLewis.
 Mary Beaufort (b. between 1431 and 1455)

Third marriage
She married thirdly to Walter Rokesley. There was no known issue from this marriage.

Death
She died on 6 March 1467 at the age of 58 at Baynard's Castle, London, England.

Ancestry

References

1408 births
1467 deaths
Daughters of British earls
de Ros
English duchesses by marriage
People from Warwickshire
Date of birth unknown
Eleanor
Eleanor
15th-century English women 
15th-century English people
Wives of knights